Mustapha Dahleb (born 8 February 1952) is an Algerian former professional footballer who played as a midfielder. Having begun his career at Sedan and CR Belouizdad, he spent most of his career at Paris Saint-Germain before playing a final season at Nice. At international level, Dahleb represented the Algeria national team.

He holds the records of being the fourth-highest goalscorer for Paris Saint-Germain in the French first division and sixth all-time goalscorer in all competitions.

Career
Dahleb played with the Algeria national team in the 1982 FIFA World Cup, where Algeria failed to make it out of the group stage.

He held the record of the all-time leading scorer for Paris Saint-Germain in the French first division with 85 goals before being surpassed by Zlatan Ibrahimovic. Dahleb is the club's sixth all-time goalscorer in all competitions, with 98 goals.

References

External links
 

Living people
1952 births
Kabyle people
Association football midfielders
Footballers from Béjaïa
Algerian footballers
Algerian expatriate footballers
Algeria international footballers
CS Sedan Ardennes players
CR Belouizdad players
Paris Saint-Germain F.C. players
OGC Nice players
Ligue 1 players
Ligue 2 players
Expatriate footballers in France
Algerian expatriate sportspeople in France
African Games competitors for Algeria
Footballers at the 1973 All-Africa Games
1982 FIFA World Cup players
21st-century Algerian people